Tom Lawday (born 11 November 1993) is a professional rugby union player for Harlequins. He plays as a back row forward, but predominantly at Number 8.

A former BUCS player of the season, in November 2016, Lawday played his first of 22 senior games for Exeter Chiefs in the Anglo-Welsh Cup against Harlequins at the Stoop and a week later he then scored his first try for the Chiefs against Cardiff Blues at Sandy Park.

In August 2017 he joined the Cornish Pirates on loan.

He was a replacement in the Premiership final against Exeter on 26 June 2021 as Harlequins won the game 40-38 in the highest scoring Premiership final ever.

References

1993 births
Living people
Exeter Chiefs players
Harlequin F.C. players
Rugby union number eights
Rugby union players from Dorchester, Dorset